Operation Hardtack was the name of a series of British Commando raids during the Second World War. The operation was conducted by No. 10 (Inter-Allied) Commando, No. 12 Commando and the Special Boat Service, and took place on the Channel islands and the northern coast of France in December 1943.  Most of the raids consisted of ten men of various ranks, carried by Motor Torpedo Boats and dories, except for one operation, which was an airborne landing.  The raids were ended by order of Major General Robert Laycock because they caused the enemy to bring reinforcements, which could have been detrimental to the Allies' strategy.

Raids

References

Bibliography
 
 
 
 

Conflicts in 1943
World War II British Commando raids
1943 in France
Military history of the Channel Islands during World War II
December 1943 events